Marvin R. Shanken (born October 4, 1943) is an American publisher and founder of M. Shanken Communications. Shanken's roster of lifestyle publications includes Wine Spectator, Cigar Aficionado and Whisky Advocate. Based in Manhattan, M. Shanken Communications has offices in Napa, California and Emmaus, Pennsylvania.

Life and career
Shanken grew up in New Haven, Connecticut.  He is of Judaic heritage.  He received an undergraduate BBA degree in 1965 from the University of Miami, and then an MBA at American University in 1968.

Shanken started his career in real estate and investment banking, then moved into publishing in 1973, purchasing Impact, a small wine and spirits industry newsletter. His company has expanded to other trade publications including Market Watch, Shanken News Daily and Impact Newsletter. In 1979, he purchased Wine Spectator a few years after its 1976 founding,  and launched Cigar Aficionado in September 1992. He also spearheaded Wine Spectator’s entry to the digital world, with mobile apps including Wine Spectator WineRatings+, Xvalues and Wine Spectator Restaurant Awards.

As editor and publisher of Cigar Aficionado, Shanken has interviewed famous-yet-elusive leaders, artists and celebrities including Fidel Castro (1994), Francis Ford Coppola (2003), General Tommy Franks (2003), Arnon Milchan (2008), Michael Jordan (2005, 2017) and Robert De Niro (2015), Ray Lewis (2016), Alex Rodriguez (2018) and Dwayne "The Rock" Johnson (2020). In 2020, Shanken's interview with Michael Jordan was posted online. To date, it has been seen by over 6 million viewers.

He is also editor and publisher of Wine Spectator. In 2017, he assumed the same title at Whiskey Advocate. In 2022, Shanken released never-before-seen footage of a rare video interview he conducted with Ernest Gallo that took place in 1999.

Shanken was one of the first magazine publishers to host reader-focused events, with the launches of the New York Wine Experience in 1981, WhiskyFest in 1998 and the Big Smoke in 1993. Today there are over a dozen events annually in New York, Washington D.C., Chicago, Las Vegas, San Francisco and Miami. The annual Impact Marketing Seminar for wine and spirits industry leaders from around the world began in 1977 and has featured renowned speakers such as Bill Clinton, George W. Bush, Henry Kissinger, Dick Cheney, Rudy Giuliani, Michael Milken, Ron DeSantis, Abba Eban, Madeleine Albright, John R. Bolton, Newt Gingrich, Tommy Franks, Helmut Schmidt and Walter Cronkite.

Awards
In 2019, Shanken was the recipient of the Lifetime Achievement Award from the MPA, the Association of Magazine Media, honoring individuals who have made longstanding contributions to the magazine media industry and society. The tribute was made by Jonathan Newhouse, chairman and chief executive of Condé Nast International. In 2018, Shanken received the Lifetime Achievement Award from Meininger Verlaga—a German media company founded in 1903 specializing in wine and spirits trade publications—for his impact on the global wine industry. In 2012, Shanken was named among the Who’s Who of Food & Beverage in America by the James Beard Foundation.

Personal
Shanken and his wife Hazel collect French poster art from the 1890s to WWI, the era of Toulouse-Lautrec. The collection is showcased in a book by Jack Rennert called Posters of the Belle Epoque. He has three daughters, Samantha Shanken Baker, Allison Cohen and Jessica Elizabeth Shanken Reid. Jessica serves as vice president, Business Development at M. Shanken.

Philanthropy
Shanken is the creator of several annual charity events including Wine Spectator's New York Wine Experience weekend started in 1981; Cigar Aficionado's Night to Remember dinner for prostate cancer since 1993; and the Els for Autism Pro-Am golf tournament in 2010, which together have raised more than $50,000,000.  The monies have been donated to many educational and culinary institutions. He is also founder of the Wine Spectator Scholarship Foundation, which funded the Wine Spectator Learning Center at Sonoma State University, which opened in the summer of 2017, and 924 scholarships and grants totaling 3.6 million dollars for students at the University of California, Davis School of Viticulture and Enology. In 2020 a $250,000 contribution was made to José Andrés' Charity, World Central Kitchen and a $100,000 donation was made to the Glancy Wine Education Foundation providing scholarships to students at San Francisco Wine School. In 2021, the Foundation made a  record $10 million commitment to Napa Valley College to support the construction and expansion of the college's Viticulture, Wine and Technology program teaching spaces, which will be named the Wine Spectator Wine Education Complex at Napa Valley College.

In 2009, Shanken, along with Ernie Els and Liezl Els, founded the Els for Autism Foundation in Jupiter, Florida. The Foundation built and runs a school for 300 autistic boys and girls on an expansive 26-acre campus in Jupiter. In 2018, the Els for Autism Foundation and the Seaver Autism Center for Research and Treatment at Mount Sinai partnered to create the Seaver Els Institute, a research organization to analyze data for early intervention.

Shanken is an Honorary Board Member of the Prostate Cancer Foundation and on the board of directors of the MPA (Association of Magazine Media). In 2017, he was elected to the board of trustees of the University of Miami and Chairman of the Els for Autism Foundation.

In 2016 at the annual Els Pro Am, Rickie Fowler shot a hole in one, resulting in a $1,000,000 donation.

References

External links
M. Shanken Communications, Inc.
Marvin Shanken via Charlie Rose

American publishers (people)
Living people
1943 births
James Beard Foundation Award winners